David Steinberg   (born August 9, 1942) is a Canadian comedian, actor, writer, director, and author. At the height of his popularity, during the late 1960s and mid 1970s, he was one of the best-known comics in the United States. He appeared on The Tonight Show Starring Johnny Carson more than 130 times (second only to Bob Hope in number of appearances) and served as guest host 12 times, the youngest person ever to guest-host. Steinberg directed several films and episodes of television situation comedies, including Seinfeld, Friends, Mad About You, Curb Your Enthusiasm, The Golden Girls, and Designing Women. Since 2012, Steinberg has hosted the interview program Inside Comedy on the Showtime network.

Early life
Steinberg was born on August 9, 1942 in Winnipeg, Manitoba, Canada. He is the son of Rabbi Yasha Steinberg (1896-1966), a strict, Romanian-born rabbi, and Ruth Steinberg (circa 1904-1989). He is the youngest of four children and has three older siblings: two older brothers, Hymie Steinberg (1925-1944) and Fishy Steinberg, and one older sister, Tammy Lazer (née Steinberg). His elder brother Hymie served during World War II and was killed in action when he was  19. David initially studied theology in Israel. Later, while studying English Literature at the University of Chicago, he decided to become a comedian after seeing Lenny Bruce perform. He finished school and was discovered by one of the founders of The Second City in Chicago, which he joined in 1964. There he performed with Robert Klein, Fred Willard, Peter Boyle, and Joe Flaherty. He remained with the group for six years. In 1972, Steinberg was best man at the wedding of his friend, the gangster Crazy Joe Gallo.

Career
One of Steinberg's most notorious performances was in October 1968 on The Smothers Brothers Comedy Hour, where he gave satirical sermons. The sketch caused CBS to receive a record number of complaints, and, as a result, the network instituted a policy of providing local stations with a closed-circuit telecast of each episode ahead of time so they could choose whether or not to air it. The Smothers Brothers were told by the network that they could have Steinberg on the show again on the condition that he would not repeat the sermons. Nevertheless, Tommy Smothers asked Steinberg to do it again, and he gave a sermon in which he said "The Old Testament scholars say that Jonah was swallowed by a whale. The Gentiles, the New Testament scholars say, 'Hold it, Jews, no.'  They literally grabbed the Jews by the Old Testament." This incident contributed to the cancellation of the show. The Jonah sketch was never aired by CBS.

Steinberg appeared in two Broadway flops, Little Murders and Carry Me Back to Morningside Heights, which both closed within one week in 1967 and 1968, respectively.

Steinberg was the most frequent host of the pop and rock music ABC television show, The Music Scene, 1969–1970. The show featured performances by Joe Cocker and CSN&Y. In 1972, Steinberg wrote and starred in The David Steinberg Show in the United States as a five-week summer replacement sketch comedy show. Around the same time, TV Guide labelled Steinberg "offbeat, racy, outrageous, and establishment-baiting – all of which makes him a particular favorite among the young and disenchanted."

In 1975 Steinberg hosted Noonday, a short-lived half-hour midday talk show on NBC.

In 1976, Steinberg returned to Canada to produce a second show called The David Steinberg Show.  This series was a hybrid sitcom/variety show, modelled loosely on The Jack Benny Program in that the plots centred on the star (Steinberg) and his cast trying to put together another instalment of their variety show.  Amongst the regular cast were future SCTV stars Joe Flaherty, John Candy, Dave Thomas, and Martin Short. SCTV's Andrea Martin also appeared on the show, but not as a regular.  SCTV premiered the same week as The David Steinberg Show, and ran for six seasons; The David Steinberg Show lasted only one season.

Steinberg performed some notable stand-up comedy during the 1960s and '70s. He released four comedy LPs, including The Incredible Shrinking God (LP MCA 73013, 1968), which contains ten of his comedic sermons and mini-sermons recorded live during his stand-up routine at Second City. He also hosted the 1977 Juno Awards show. He was inducted into Canada's Walk of Fame in 2003.

More recently (2005–2007), Steinberg hosted Sit Down Comedy with David Steinberg, an informal, interview-style show in which he talks with famous comedians and comic actors, for two seasons on TV Land in the U.S. The first season featured Mike Myers, Larry David, Jon Lovitz, Martin Short, Bob Newhart, and George Lopez. The second season featured Jerry Seinfeld, Robin Williams, Roseanne Barr, Jon Stewart, Garry Shandling and Ray Romano. The program was filmed before an audience at UCLA.

His first book, The Book of David, was published in June 2007 by Simon & Schuster.

In 2010, he directed and produced the Canadian cable comedy series Living in Your Car.

Personal life
Steinberg has been married twice. He married Judy Marcione in 1973 and they had two daughters. They divorced in 1997 after 24 years of marriage. Steinberg married Robyn Todd in 2005.

Discography
 The Incredible Shrinking God (UNI LP, UNI-73013, 1968)
 Disguised As A Normal Person (Elektra Records LP, EKS-74065, 1970).
 Booga! Booga! (Columbia LP, 1974)
 Goodbye to the '70s (Columbia LP, PC 33399, 1975)

Awards
Steinberg has received five Emmy Award nominations, winning two as one of the writers of Academy Awards programs in 1991 and 1992. He received a CableACE Award in 1992 for his stand-up comedy Cats, Cops and Stuff.  He has been nominated for the Directors Guild of America Award (for Outstanding Directing – Comedy Series) twice: first in 1991 for the Seinfeld episode, The Tape, and again in 1996 for the Mad About You episode, The Finale: Parts II and III, and has been nominated for a Canadian Comedy Award (2000) and a Gemini (2001), as well. His parody of the novel Ragtime won him a Playboy Humor Award. In 2003, he was inducted into Canada's Walk of Fame.

In December 2016, Steinberg was named a Member of the Order of Canada.

Film

Television

References

External links
 
 

 
 Official David Steinberg site 
 Interview, online from CBC Words at Large (audio)

1942 births
20th-century Canadian male actors
21st-century Canadian male actors
Canadian expatriate male actors in the United States
Canadian male film actors
Canadian male television actors
Canadian male voice actors
Canadian male comedians
Canadian people of Romanian-Jewish descent
Canadian sketch comedians
Canadian stand-up comedians
Canadian television directors
Canadian television producers
Columbia Records artists
Elektra Records artists
Jewish Canadian male actors
Living people
Male actors from Winnipeg
Primetime Emmy Award winners
Uni Records artists
University of Chicago alumni
Jewish Canadian comedians
Members of the Order of Canada
20th-century Canadian comedians
21st-century Canadian comedians
Comedians from Manitoba